Seven Tour is a concert tour by British singer Lisa Stansfield, in support of her 2014 album Seven. During the tour Stansfield performed her hit songs along the new tracks from her latest album, including "Can't Dance," "Stupid Heart," "Conversation" and others. The tour started on 16 May 2013 in Paris, France, and ended on 4 November 2014 in Riga, Latvia. Stansfield played over 60 concerts in Europe. The show at the Bridgewater Hall in Manchester on 7 September 2014 was recorded for a forthcoming live DVD due for release on 25 August 2015. It is titled Live in Manchester.

Set list

Tour dates

Personnel
 Tour manager, front of house sound engineer: Walter Jacquiss
 Tour assistant: Cally Harris May 2013
 Tour assistant: Sooze Moyes June 2013 - present
 Stage manager, backline tech: Stephen Curran
 Monitor engineer: Colm Meade

Band
 Lead vocals: Lisa Stansfield
 Keyboards, musical director: Dave Oliver
 Keyboards, guitar: Ian Devaney
 Trumpet, flugelhorn: John Thirkell
 Sax, flute: Mickey Donnelly
 Percussion: Snowboy
 Drums: Davide Giovannini
 Bass guitar: Davide Mantovani
 Background vocals: Andrea Grant (UK & European dates 2013 & 2014)
 Background vocals: Wendi (Ruby) Rose (Autumn European dates 2014)
 Guitar: Al Cherry (UK dates Nov 2013)
 Guitar: Terry Lewis (UK & European dates May -Nov 2014)
 Background vocals: Lorraine Cato-Price (UK dates 2013 & London show Sept 2014)

References 

2013 concert tours
2014 concert tours
Lisa Stansfield